The 2011 Chicago Knights season is the fourth season for the Continental Indoor Football League (CIFL) franchise, and the 1st as the franchise's name change to the Knights.

Standings

Final roster

Schedule

Playoff schedule

Stats

Passing

Rushing

Receiving

Regular season

Week 2: vs Cincinnati Commandos

Week 6: vs Port Huron Predators

Week 7: vs Indianapolis Enforcers

Week 8: vs Indianapolis Enforcers

Week 9: vs Dayton Silverbacks

Week 10: vs Marion Blue Racers

Week 11: vs Cincinnati Commandos

Week 12: vs Dayton Silverbacks

Week 13: vs Marion Blue Racers

Week 15: vs Port Huron Predators

Playoffs

2011 1 vs 4 Semifinal Game vs. Cincinnati Commandos

References

2011 Continental Indoor Football League season
Chicago Knights
Chicago Knights